The 1952–53 Landsdelsserien was a Norwegian second-tier football league season.

The league was contested by 54 teams, divided into a total of seven groups from four districts; Østland/Søndre, Østland/Nordre, Sørland/Vestre and Møre/Trøndelag. The two group winners in the Østland districts, Moss and Geithus promoted directly to the 1953–54 Hovedserien. The other five group winners qualified for promotion play-offs to compete for two spots in the following season's top flight. Nordnes and Freidig won the play-offs and were promoted.

Tables

District Østland/Søndre

District Østland/Nordre

District Sørland/Vestland

Group A1

Group A2

Group B

District Møre/Trøndelag

Møre

Trøndelag

Promotion play-offs
Sørland/Vestland 
Results A1–A2
Flekkefjord 3–2 Djerv 1919
Results A–B
Flekkefjord 2–2 (a.e.t.) Nordnes
Flekkefjord 2–3 Nordnes 

Nordnes won 3–2 over Flekkefjord and were promoted to Hovedserien.

Møre/Trøndelag
Langevåg 0–1 Freidig

Freidig won 1–0 over Langevåg and were promoted to Hovedserien.

References

Norwegian First Division seasons
1952 in Norwegian football
1953 in Norwegian football
Norway